This is a list of Bulgarian football transfers for the 2015 summer transfer window. Only transfers involving a team from the A Group and B Group are listed.

A Group

Beroe

In:

Out:

Botev Plovdiv

In:

Out:

Cherno More

In:

Out:

Levski Sofia

In:

Out:

Litex Lovech

In:

Out:

Lokomotiv Plovdiv

In:

Out:

Ludogorets Razgrad

In:

Out:

Montana

In:

Out:

Pirin Blagoevgrad

In:

Out:

Slavia Sofia

In:

Out:

B Group

Bansko

In:

Out:

Botev Galabovo

In:

Out:

Dobrudzha Dobrich

In:

Out:

Dunav Ruse

In:

Out:

Litex Lovech II

In:

Out:

Lokomotiv GO

In:

Out:

Lokomotiv 2012 Mezdra

In:

Out:

Ludogorets Razgrad II

In:

Out:

Neftochimic Burgas

In:

Out:

Oborishte

In:

Out:

Pirin Razlog

In:

Out:

Pomorie

In:

Out:

Septemvri Simitli

In:

Out:

Sozopol

In:

Out:

Spartak Pleven

In:

Out:

Vereya

In:

	

Out:

References

Bulgaria
Summer 2015